Dalu Hasan (also Romanized as Dalū Ḩasan) is a village in Almalu Rural District, Nazarkahrizi District, Hashtrud County, East Azerbaijan Province, Iran. At the 2006 census, its population was 238, in 44 families.

References 

Towns and villages in Hashtrud County